Alix Kévynn Nyokas (born 28 June 1986) is a French-born Congolese handball player for Al-Ahli and the Congolese national team.

Career
Nyokas started his career at Paris Saint Germain, and then played for Chambéry Savoie HB, Frisch Auf Göppingen and VfL Gummersbach. At international level, he played for the France national team.

After the 2016–17 season, Nyokas retired from playing handball. However, on 4 September 2018, he returned to professional handball as a player of Portuguese side S.L. Benfica.

Honors 
 Macedonian Handball Super League
 Winner: 2022
 Macedonian Handball Cup
 Winner: 2022

References

1986 births
Living people
Sportspeople from Montreuil, Seine-Saint-Denis
French male handball players
S.L. Benfica handball players
Expatriate handball players
French expatriates in Portugal